Ahmed Gomaa (born 16 August 1988), is an Egyptian footballer who plays for Egyptian Premier League side Al Masry, and the Egyptian national team as a forward.

Club career

Abou Bedway
In 2003, during Ramadan when Gomaa was playing football with his friends, Abou Bedway's manager, Ibrahim Abou Sita, offered him a trial at the club; Gomaa didn't like the idea to join a football club and wanted to play football only as a hobby, but his family and friends convinced him that joining the club may be the start of a great football career. Gomma joined Abou Bedway at the age of 15 and played for the reserve team for only one year, before he moved to Ghazl El Mahalla.

Ghazl El Mahalla
In 2004, Gomma joined Ghazl El Mahalla and was selected to play for the reserve team. After playing for the reserves for 4 years he was promoted to the first team after the manager, Khaled Eid, was impressed by his style of play. However, Ghazl El Mahalla ended his contract by mutual consent after playing only 1 season with the first team.

El Raja
In 2009, Gomma joined El Raja. He spent 2 years at the club and helped to avoid the relegation during the 2010–11 Egyptian Second Division.

El Mansoura
He scored his first goal in his official debut on 17 November 2011 against Baladeyet El Mahalla in a 1–2 loss in the 2011–12 Egyptian Second Division. He scored 4 goals in 7 matches in his first season, however all of the football competitions in Egypt were suspended by the Egyptian Football Association after the Port Said Stadium riot occurred. Gomma finished his second season as the club's top goalscorer, scoring 16 goals in 25 matches. He also finished as the club's top goalscorer in the next season despite scoring only 6 goals in 19 matches in a disappointing season for his side as they failed to qualify to the promotion play-offs. His last goal for El Mansoura was on 12 May 2014 against Ittihad Nabarouh in a 1–1 draw in the league.

Al Masry
On 22 July 2014, Al Masry announced the signing of Gomaa from El Mansoura in a 3-year contract for an undisclosed fee. Gomaa had a hard start with Al Masry under Tarek Yehia, who wasn't convinced with his ability. He played only 4 matches and ended up being benched during the first half of the season.

Loan to Ittihad El Shorta
On 14 January 2015, Ittihad El Shorta announced the signing of Gomaa and his teammate Eliassou Issiaka on loan until the end of the 2014–15 Egyptian Premier League season. He scored 4 goals in 20 appearances with the club. On 28 May 2015, Gomaa scored against the league winners Zamalek in a 5–1 loss. Ittihad El Shorta finished the season in the 15th place, one point above the relegation zone and 5 points below Al Masry.

Return to Al Masry

Ohod

International career
On 29 December 2016, Gomaa was called up for the national team for the first time in his career as he was named in Egypt's preliminary squad for the 2017 Africa Cup of Nations in Gabon. However, he wasn't included in the final squad for the tournament.

In May 2018 he was named in Egypt's preliminary squad for the 2018 World Cup in Russia. He made his debut for the national team on 25 May in a friendly match against Kuwait, coming on as a substitute for Kouka early in the second half.

References

1988 births
Living people
People from Kafr El Sheikh Governorate
Egyptian footballers
Egyptian expatriate footballers
Expatriate footballers in Saudi Arabia
Egyptian expatriate sportspeople in Saudi Arabia
Association football forwards
Egyptian Premier League players
Saudi Professional League players
Ghazl El Mahalla SC players
El Raja SC players
El Mansoura SC players
Al Masry SC players
Ittihad El Shorta SC players
Ohod Club players
Egypt international footballers